The 2007 National League Cup (known for commercial reasons as the Northern Rail Cup) was a British rugby league competition. Various teams from the National leagues of England compete. The winners are usually National league One teams. This was evident as Widnes Vikings won the competition in 2007.

Results

Group stages
Northern Rail Cup : Group 1
Team 	                P 	W 	D 	L 	PF 	PA      Diff    Pts
Castleford Tigers 	6 	6 	0 	0 	246 	58 	188 	18
Featherstone Rovers 	6 	2 	1 	3 	130 	164 	-34 	9
Sheffield Eagles 	6 	1 	1 	4 	86 	174 	-88 	7
Doncaster Lakers 	6 	1 	1 	4 	110 	176 	-66 	7
Northern Rail Cup : Group 2
Team 	                P 	W 	D 	L 	PF 	PA 	Diff 	Pts
Halifax 	6 	6 	0 	0 	242 	70 	172 	18
York City Knights 	6 	4 	0 	2 	188 	144 	44 	12
Keighley Cougars 	6 	2 	0 	4 	136 	184 	-48 	7
Gateshead Thunder 	6 	0 	0 	6 	68 	236 	-168 	1
Northern Rail Cup : Group 3
Team 	                P 	W 	D 	L 	PF 	PA 	Diff 	Pts
Dewsbury Rams 	6 	5 	0 	1 	228 	64 	164 	16
Batley Bulldogs 	6 	2 	0 	4 	100 	137 	-37 	8
Hunslet Hawks 	6 	2 	1 	3 	74 	187 	-113 	8
Northern Rail Cup : Group 4
Team 	                P 	W 	D 	L 	PF 	PA 	Diff 	Pts
Rochdale Hornets 	6 	5 	0 	1 	164 	78 	86 	16
Swinton Lions 	6 	2 	1 	3 	118 	172 	-54 	8
Oldham	        6 	1 	0 	5 	104 	150 	-46 	6
Northern Rail Cup : Group 5
Team 	                P 	W 	D 	L 	PF 	PA 	Diff 	Pts
Whitehaven	        6 	5 	1 	0 	234 	76 	158 	17
Barrow Raiders 	6 	3 	1 	2 	210 	108 	102 	13
Workington Town 	6 	3 	0 	3 	136 	210 	-74 	9
Blackpool Panthers 	6 	0 	0 	6 	92 	278 	-186 	2
Northern Rail Cup : Group 6
Team 	                P 	W 	D 	L 	PF 	PA 	Diff 	Pts
Widnes Vikings 	6 	5 	0 	1 	256 	70 	186 	15
Celtic Crusaders 	6 	4 	0 	2 	136 	156 	-20 	12
Leigh Centurions 	6 	3 	0 	3 	192 	120 	72 	11
London Skolars        6 	0 	0 	6 	72 	310 	-238 	0
Northern Rail Cup : Group 7
Team 	                P 	W 	D 	L 	PF 	PA 	Diff 	Pts
Bramley Buffaloes 	6 	6 	0 	0 	204 	94 	110 	18
Warrington Wizards 	6 	2 	0 	4 	170 	158 	12 	8
Dewsbury Celtic 	6 	2 	0 	4 	142 	180 	-38 	7
Hemel Stags 6 	2 	0 	4 	106 	190 	-84 	6

Finals
Grand Final

Whitehaven 6    v   Widnes Vikings 54

Northern Rail Cup - Semi Final Results

Whitehaven 34 - Halifax 19
Widnes 18 - Castleford 12

Whitehaven (6) 34
T: D Eilbeck 1, L Joe 1, J Duffy 1, A Smith 1, C Rudd 1,
C Sice 1,
G: R Fletcher 1, C Rudd 4,

Halifax (19) 19
T: R Varkulis 1, L Greenwood 1, P Smith 1,
G: G Holroyd 3,
DG: I Watson 1,

Widnes (14) 18
T: M Nanyn 1, O Wilkes 1,
G: M Nanyn 5,:

Castleford (12) 12
T: R Boyle 2,
G: D Brough 2,

Northern Rail Cup - Quarter Final Results

Rochdale Hornets 0 - Widnes Vikings 24
Halifax 30 - Celtic Crusaders 14
Castleford Tigers 42 - Leigh Centurions 6
Rochdale Hornets 0 - Widnes Vikings 24
Whitehaven 34 - Barrow Raiders 14
Northern Rail Cup Group Tables

External links 
Rugby Football league
Northern Rail
International Rugby League Forums

2007 in British sport
2007 in English rugby league
2007 in Welsh rugby league
Championship Cup